The Malisbong Masjid or H. Hamsa Tacbil Mosque  massacre, also called the Palimbang massacre, was the mass murder of Muslim Moros by units of the Philippine military on September 24, 1974, in the coastal village of Malisbong in Palimbang, Sultan Kudarat, Mindanao. Accounts compiled by the Moro Women's Center in General Santos state that 1,500 male Moros aged 11–70 were killed inside a mosque, 3,000 women and children aged 9–60 were detained – with the women being raped – and that 300 houses were razed by the government forces. The massacre occurred two years after Ferdinand Marcos declared martial law in September 1972.

The massacre started after the first four days on the fast of Ramadan when members of the Philippine Army arrived and captured barangay officials along with 1,000 other Muslims. For more than a month, the military murdered residents of the area. Testimonies show that victims were made to strip and dig their own graves before being killed by gunshot.

Remuneration for victims
In 2011, the Moro Islamic Liberation Front sought compensation for the Moro victims of martial law violence in the wake of the distribution of $7.5 million in compensation for more than 1,000 individuals who filed a class action suit against the Marcoses. The MILF claimed that thousands of Moros were killed in massacres such as what took place in Malisbong, perpetrated by soldiers and state-sponsored paramilitary forces during martial law. These included the Manili massacre, Tacub massacre, Patikul massacre, and Pata Island massacre.

In 2014, the Philippine government finally recognized 1,500 Moro residents of Malisbong village killed in the massacre as martial law victims. Representatives of the Commission on Human Rights helped facilitate the claims of the survivors and the families of the massacre victims to the Php10 billion fund set by the government for the indemnification of human rights victims during the martial law regime of Ferdinand Marcos, in keeping with the provisions of Republic Act No. 10368, or the Human Rights Victims Reparation and Recognition Act of 2013.

In popular culture
Forbidden Memory is a 2016 film based on the Malisbong massacre, directed by Davao-based Maguindanao filmmaker Gutierrez Mangansakan. It won Best Documentary from the three finalists in the 12th Cinema One Originals, the annual film festival sponsored by Cinema One.

Denial 
Rigoberto Tiglao and Juan Ponce Enrile have denied that the massacre had ever happened.

References

1974 in the Philippines
September 1974 events in Asia
Massacres in the Philippines
Massacres of men
Attacks on mosques
Mass murder in 1974
Massacres in 1974
Presidency of Ferdinand Marcos
History of Sultan Kudarat
Violence against men in Asia
Violence against women in the Philippines
Violence against Muslims
Massacres under the Marcos dictatorship
Massacres of Muslims